J. Robert Oppenheimer (April 22, 1904 – February 18, 1967) was an American theoretical physicist. A professor of physics at the University of California, Berkeley, Oppenheimer was the wartime head of the Los Alamos Laboratory and is often credited as the "father of the atomic bomb" for his role in the Manhattan Project—the World War II undertaking that developed the first nuclear weapons. Oppenheimer was among those who observed the Trinity test in New Mexico, where the first atomic bomb was successfully detonated on July 16, 1945. He later remarked that the explosion brought to mind words from the Bhagavad Gita: "Now I am become Death, the destroyer of worlds." In August 1945, the weapons were used in the atomic bombings of Hiroshima and Nagasaki.

After the war ended, Oppenheimer became chairman of the influential General Advisory Committee of the newly created United States Atomic Energy Commission. He used that position to lobby for international control of nuclear power to avert nuclear proliferation and a nuclear arms race with the Soviet Union. He opposed the development of the hydrogen bomb during a 1949–1950 governmental debate on the question and subsequently took stances on defense-related issues that provoked the ire of some U.S. government and military factions. During the Second Red Scare, those stances, together with past associations Oppenheimer had with people and organizations affiliated with the Communist Party, led to the revocation of his security clearance in a much-written-about hearing in 1954. Effectively stripped of his direct political influence, he continued to lecture, write, and work in physics. Nine years later, President John F. Kennedy awarded (and Lyndon B. Johnson presented) him with the Enrico Fermi Award as a gesture of political rehabilitation. In 2022, five decades after his death, the U.S. government formally nullified its 1954 decision and affirmed Oppenheimer's loyalty.

Oppenheimer's achievements in physics included the Born–Oppenheimer approximation for molecular wave functions, work on the theory of electrons and positrons, the Oppenheimer–Phillips process in nuclear fusion, and the first prediction of quantum tunneling. With his students he also made important contributions to the modern theory of neutron stars and black holes, as well as to quantum mechanics, quantum field theory, and the interactions of cosmic rays. As a teacher and promoter of science, he is remembered as a founding father of the American school of theoretical physics that gained world prominence in the 1930s. After World War II, he became director of the Institute for Advanced Study in Princeton, New Jersey.

Early life

Childhood and education 
J. Robert Oppenheimer was born into a Jewish family in New York City on April 22, 1904, to Ella (née Friedman), a painter, and Julius Seligmann Oppenheimer, a wealthy textile importer. Julius was born in Hanau, then part of the Hesse-Nassau province of the Kingdom of Prussia, and came to the United States as a teenager in 1888 with few resources, no money, no baccalaureate studies, and no knowledge of the English language. He was hired by a textile company and within a decade was an executive there, eventually becoming wealthy. Oppenheimer's family were nonobservant Jews. In 1912, the family moved to an apartment on the 11th floor of 155 Riverside Drive, near West 88th Street, Manhattan, an area known for luxurious mansions and townhouses. Their art collection included works by Pablo Picasso and Édouard Vuillard, and at least three original paintings by Vincent van Gogh. Robert had a younger brother, Frank, who also became a physicist, and who later founded the Exploratorium science museum in San Francisco.

Oppenheimer was initially educated at Alcuin Preparatory School; in 1911, he entered the Ethical Culture Society School. This had been founded by Felix Adler to promote a form of ethical training based on the Ethical Culture movement, whose motto was "Deed before Creed". His father had been a member of the Society for many years, serving on its board of trustees from 1907 to 1915. Oppenheimer was a versatile scholar, interested in English and French literature, and particularly in mineralogy. He completed the third and fourth grades in one year and skipped half of the eighth grade. During his final year, he became interested in chemistry. He entered Harvard College one year after graduation, at age 18, because he suffered an attack of colitis while prospecting in Joachimstal during a family summer vacation in Europe. To help him recover from the illness, his father enlisted the help of his English teacher Herbert Smith, who took him to New Mexico, where Oppenheimer fell in love with horseback riding and the southwestern United States.

Oppenheimer majored in chemistry, but Harvard required science students to also study history, literature, and philosophy or mathematics. He compensated for his late start by taking six courses each term and was admitted to the undergraduate honor society Phi Beta Kappa. In his first year, he was admitted to graduate standing in physics on the basis of independent study, which meant he was not required to take the basic classes and could enroll instead in advanced ones. He was attracted to experimental physics by a course on thermodynamics taught by Percy Bridgman. He graduated summa cum laude in three years.

Studies in Europe 

In 1924, Oppenheimer was informed that he had been accepted into Christ's College, Cambridge. He wrote to Ernest Rutherford requesting permission to work at the Cavendish Laboratory. Bridgman provided Oppenheimer with a recommendation, which conceded that Oppenheimer's clumsiness in the laboratory made it apparent his forte was not experimental but rather theoretical physics. Rutherford was unimpressed, but Oppenheimer went to Cambridge in the hope of landing another offer. He was ultimately accepted by J. J. Thomson on condition that he complete a basic laboratory course. He developed an antagonistic relationship with his tutor, Patrick Blackett, who was only a few years his senior. While on vacation, as recalled by his friend Francis Fergusson, Oppenheimer once confessed that he had left an apple doused with noxious chemicals on Blackett's desk. While Fergusson's account is the only detailed version of this event, Oppenheimer's parents were alerted by the university authorities who considered placing him on probation, a fate prevented by his parents successfully lobbying the authorities.

Oppenheimer was a tall, thin chain smoker, who often neglected to eat during periods of intense thought and concentration. Many of his friends said he had self-destructive tendencies. A disturbing event occurred when he took a vacation from his studies in Cambridge to meet up with Fergusson in Paris. Fergusson noticed that Oppenheimer was not well. To help distract him from his depression, Fergusson told Oppenheimer that he (Fergusson) was to marry his girlfriend, Frances Keeley. Oppenheimer did not take the news well. He jumped on Fergusson and tried to strangle him. Although Fergusson easily fended off the attack, the episode convinced him of Oppenheimer's deep psychological troubles. Throughout his life, Oppenheimer was plagued by periods of depression, and he once told his brother, "I need physics more than friends".

In 1926, Oppenheimer left Cambridge for the University of Göttingen to study under Max Born. Göttingen was one of the world's leading centers for theoretical physics. Oppenheimer made friends who went on to great success, including Werner Heisenberg, Pascual Jordan, Wolfgang Pauli, Paul Dirac, Enrico Fermi and Edward Teller. He was known for being too enthusiastic in discussion, sometimes to the point of taking over seminar sessions. This irritated some of Born's other students so much that Maria Goeppert presented Born with a petition signed by herself and others threatening a boycott of the class unless he made Oppenheimer quiet down. Born left it out on his desk where Oppenheimer could read it, and it was effective without a word being said.

Oppenheimer obtained his Doctor of Philosophy degree in March 1927 at age 23, supervised by Born. After the oral exam, James Franck, the professor administering, reportedly said, "I'm glad that's over. He was on the point of questioning me." Oppenheimer published more than a dozen papers while in Europe, including many important contributions to the new field of quantum mechanics. He and Born published a famous paper on the Born–Oppenheimer approximation, which separates nuclear motion from electronic motion in the mathematical treatment of molecules, allowing nuclear motion to be neglected to simplify calculations. It remains his most cited work.

Early professional work

Educational work 
Oppenheimer was awarded a United States National Research Council fellowship to the California Institute of Technology (Caltech) in September 1927. Bridgman also wanted him at Harvard, so a compromise was reached whereby he split his fellowship for the 1927–28 academic year between Harvard in 1927 and Caltech in 1928. At Caltech he struck up a close friendship with Linus Pauling, and they planned to mount a joint attack on the nature of the chemical bond, a field in which Pauling was a pioneer, with Oppenheimer supplying the mathematics and Pauling interpreting the results. Both the collaboration and their friendship ended when Pauling began to suspect Oppenheimer of becoming too close to his wife, Ava Helen Pauling. Once, when Pauling was at work, Oppenheimer had arrived at their home and invited Ava Helen to join him on a tryst in Mexico. Though she refused and reported the incident to her husband, the invitation, and her apparent nonchalance about it, disquieted Pauling and he ended his relationship with Oppenheimer. Oppenheimer later invited him to become head of the Chemistry Division of the Manhattan Project, but Pauling refused, saying he was a pacifist.

In the autumn of 1928, Oppenheimer visited Paul Ehrenfest's institute at the University of Leiden, the Netherlands, where he impressed by giving lectures in Dutch, despite having little experience with the language. There he was given the nickname of Opje, later anglicized by his students as "Oppie". From Leiden he continued on to the Swiss Federal Institute of Technology (ETH) in Zurich to work with Wolfgang Pauli on quantum mechanics and the continuous spectrum. Oppenheimer respected and liked Pauli and may have emulated his personal style as well as his critical approach to problems.

On returning to the United States, Oppenheimer accepted an associate professorship from the University of California, Berkeley, where Raymond T. Birge wanted him so badly that he expressed a willingness to share him with Caltech.

Before he began his Berkeley professorship, Oppenheimer was diagnosed with a mild case of tuberculosis and spent some weeks with his brother Frank at a New Mexico ranch, which he leased and eventually purchased. When he heard the ranch was available for lease, he exclaimed, "Hot dog!", and later called it Perro Caliente, literally "hot dog" in Spanish. Later he used to say that "physics and desert country" were his "two great loves". He recovered from tuberculosis and returned to Berkeley, where he prospered as an advisor and collaborator to a generation of physicists who admired him for his intellectual virtuosity and broad interests. His students and colleagues saw him as mesmerizing: hypnotic in private interaction, but often frigid in more public settings. His associates fell into two camps: one saw him as an aloof and impressive genius and aesthete, the other as a pretentious and insecure poseur. His students almost always fell into the former category, adopting his walk, speech, and other mannerisms, and even his inclination for reading entire texts in their original languages. Hans Bethe said of him:

Oppenheimer worked closely with Nobel Prize-winning experimental physicist Ernest O. Lawrence and his cyclotron pioneers, helping them understand the data their machines were producing at the Lawrence Berkeley National Laboratory. In 1936, Berkeley promoted him to full professor at a salary of $3,300 a year. In return he was asked to curtail his teaching at Caltech, so a compromise was reached whereby Berkeley released him for six weeks each year, enough to teach one term at Caltech.

Scientific work 
Oppenheimer did important research in theoretical astronomy (especially as related to general relativity and nuclear theory), nuclear physics, spectroscopy, and quantum field theory, including its extension into quantum electrodynamics. The formal mathematics of relativistic quantum mechanics also attracted his attention, although he doubted its validity. His work predicted many later finds, which include the neutron, meson and neutron star.

Initially, his major interest was the theory of the continuous spectrum and his first published paper, in 1926, concerned the quantum theory of molecular band spectra. He developed a method to carry out calculations of its transition probabilities. He calculated the photoelectric effect for hydrogen and X-rays, obtaining the absorption coefficient at the K-edge. His calculations accorded with observations of the X-ray absorption of the sun, but not helium. Years later it was realized that the sun was largely composed of hydrogen and that his calculations were indeed correct.

Oppenheimer also made important contributions to the theory of cosmic ray showers and started work that eventually led to descriptions of quantum tunneling. In 1931, he co-wrote a paper on the "Relativistic Theory of the Photoelectric Effect" with his student Harvey Hall, in which, based on empirical evidence, he correctly disputed Dirac's assertion that two of the energy levels of the hydrogen atom have the same energy. Subsequently, one of his doctoral students, Willis Lamb, determined that this was a consequence of what became known as the Lamb shift, for which Lamb was awarded the Nobel Prize in physics in 1955.

With his first doctoral student, Melba Phillips, Oppenheimer worked on calculations of artificial radioactivity under bombardment by deuterons. When Ernest Lawrence and Edwin McMillan bombarded nuclei with deuterons they found the results agreed closely with the predictions of George Gamow, but when higher energies and heavier nuclei were involved, the results did not conform to the theory. In 1935, Oppenheimer and Phillips worked out a theory—now known as the Oppenheimer–Phillips process—to explain the results; this theory is still in use today.

As early as 1930, Oppenheimer wrote a paper that essentially predicted the existence of the positron. This was after a paper by Paul Dirac proposed that electrons could have both a positive charge and negative energy. Dirac's paper introduced an equation, known as the Dirac equation, that unified quantum mechanics, special relativity and the then-new concept of electron spin, to explain the Zeeman effect. Oppenheimer, drawing on the body of experimental evidence, rejected the idea that the predicted positively charged electrons were protons. He argued that they would have to have the same mass as an electron, whereas experiments showed that protons were much heavier than electrons. Two years later, Carl David Anderson discovered the positron, for which he received the 1936 Nobel Prize in Physics.

In the late 1930s, Oppenheimer became interested in astrophysics, most likely through his friendship with Richard Tolman, resulting in a series of papers. In the first of these, a 1938 paper co-written with Robert Serber titled "On the Stability of Stellar Neutron Cores", Oppenheimer explored the properties of white dwarfs. This was followed by a paper co-written with one of his students, George Volkoff, "On Massive Neutron Cores", in which they demonstrated that there was a limit, the so-called Tolman–Oppenheimer–Volkoff limit, to the mass of stars beyond which they would not remain stable as neutron stars and would undergo gravitational collapse. Finally, in 1939, Oppenheimer and another of his students, Hartland Snyder, produced the paper "On Continued Gravitational Contraction", which predicted the existence of what are today known as black holes. After the Born–Oppenheimer approximation paper, these papers remain his most cited, and were key factors in the rejuvenation of astrophysical research in the United States in the 1950s, mainly by John A. Wheeler.

Oppenheimer's papers were considered difficult to understand even by the standards of the abstract topics he was expert in.  He was fond of using elegant, if extremely complex, mathematical techniques to demonstrate physical principles, though he was sometimes criticized for making mathematical mistakes, presumably out of haste. "His physics was good", said his student Snyder, "but his arithmetic awful".

After World War II, Oppenheimer published only five scientific papers, one of which was in biophysics, and none after 1950. Murray Gell-Mann, a later Nobelist who, as a visiting scientist, worked with him at the Institute for Advanced Study in 1951, offered this opinion:

Oppenheimer's diverse interests sometimes interrupted his focus on science. He liked things that were difficult and since much of the scientific work appeared easy for him, he developed an interest in the mystical and the cryptic. In 1933, he learned Sanskrit and met the Indologist Arthur W. Ryder at Berkeley. He eventually read the Bhagavad Gita and the Upanishads in the original Sanskrit, and deeply pondered them. He later cited the Gita as one of the books that most shaped his philosophy of life.

His close confidant and colleague, Nobel Prize winner Isidor Rabi, later gave his own interpretation:

In spite of this, observers such as Nobel Prize-winning physicist Luis Alvarez have suggested that if he had lived long enough to see his predictions substantiated by experiment, Oppenheimer might have won a Nobel Prize for his work on gravitational collapse, concerning neutron stars and black holes. In retrospect, some physicists and historians consider this his most important contribution, though it was not taken up by other scientists in his lifetime. The physicist and historian Abraham Pais once asked Oppenheimer what he considered his most important scientific contributions; Oppenheimer cited his work on electrons and positrons, not his work on gravitational contraction. Oppenheimer was nominated for the Nobel Prize for physics three times, in 1946, 1951 and 1967, but never won.

Private and political life 
During the 1920s, Oppenheimer remained uninformed on worldly matters. He claimed that he did not read newspapers or listen to the radio and had only learned of the Wall Street crash of 1929 while he was on a walk with Ernest Lawrence six months after the crash occurred. He once remarked that he never cast a vote until the 1936 presidential election. From 1934 on, however, he became increasingly concerned about politics and international affairs. In 1934, he earmarked three percent of his annual salary—about $100—for two years to support German physicists fleeing Nazi Germany. During the 1934 West Coast Waterfront Strike, he and some of his students, including Melba Phillips and Bob Serber, attended a longshoremen's rally. Oppenheimer repeatedly attempted to get Serber a position at Berkeley but was blocked by Birge, who felt that "one Jew in the department was enough".

Oppenheimer's mother died in 1931, and he became closer to his father who, although still living in New York, became a frequent visitor in California. When his father died in 1937, leaving $392,602 to be divided between Oppenheimer and his brother Frank, Oppenheimer immediately wrote out a will that left his estate to the University of California to be used for graduate scholarships. 

Like many young intellectuals in the 1930s, Oppenheimer supported social reforms that were later alleged to be communist ideas. He donated to many progressive causes that were branded as left-wing during the McCarthy era. The majority of his allegedly radical work consisted of hosting fundraisers for the Republican cause in the Spanish Civil War and other anti-fascist activity. He never openly joined the Communist Party USA (CPUSA), though he did pass money to leftist causes by way of acquaintances who were alleged to be party members. 

In 1936, Oppenheimer became involved with Jean Tatlock, the daughter of a Berkeley literature professor and a student at Stanford University School of Medicine. The two had similar political views; she wrote for the Western Worker, a Communist Party newspaper. In 1939, after a tempestuous relationship, Tatlock broke up with Oppenheimer. In August of that year, he met Katherine ("Kitty") Puening, a radical Berkeley student and former Communist Party member. Kitty had been married before. Her first marriage lasted only a few months. Her second, common-law marriage husband was Joe Dallet, an active member of the Communist Party, who was killed in the Spanish Civil War. Kitty returned to the United States, where she obtained a Bachelor of Arts degree in botany from the University of Pennsylvania. There she married Richard Harrison, a physician and medical researcher, in 1938. In June 1939 Kitty and Harrison moved to Pasadena, California, where he became chief of radiology at a local hospital and she enrolled as a graduate student at the University of California, Los Angeles. Oppenheimer and Kitty created a minor scandal by sleeping together after one of Tolman's parties. In the summer of 1940, she stayed with Oppenheimer at his ranch in New Mexico. She finally asked Harrison for a divorce when she found out she was pregnant. When he refused, she obtained an instant divorce in Reno, Nevada, and took Oppenheimer as her fourth husband on November 1, 1940.

Their first child, Peter, was born in May 1941, and their second, Katherine ("Toni"), was born in Los Alamos, New Mexico, on December 7, 1944. During his marriage, Oppenheimer rekindled his affair with Tatlock. Later their continued contact became an issue in his security clearance hearings, because of Tatlock's communist associations. Many of Oppenheimer's closest associates were active in the Communist Party in the 1930s or 1940s, including his brother Frank, Frank's wife Jackie, Kitty, Tatlock, his landlady Mary Ellen Washburn, and several of his graduate students at Berkeley.

When he joined the Manhattan Project in 1942, Oppenheimer wrote on his personal security questionnaire that he had been "a member of just about every Communist Front organization on the West Coast". Years later he claimed that he did not remember saying this, that it was not true, and that if he had said anything along those lines, it was "a half-jocular overstatement". He was a subscriber to the People's World, a Communist Party organ, and he testified in 1954, "I was associated with the communist movement." From 1937 to 1942, Oppenheimer was a member at Berkeley of what he called a "discussion group", which was later identified by fellow members Haakon Chevalier and Gordon Griffiths as a "closed" (secret) unit of the Communist Party for Berkeley faculty.

The FBI opened a file on Oppenheimer in March 1941. It recorded that he attended a meeting in December 1940 at Chevalier's home that was also attended by the Communist Party's California state secretary, William Schneiderman, and its treasurer, Isaac Folkoff. The FBI noted that Oppenheimer was on the Executive Committee of the American Civil Liberties Union, which it considered a communist front organization. Shortly thereafter, the FBI added Oppenheimer to its Custodial Detention Index, for arrest in case of national emergency. Debates over Oppenheimer's party membership or lack thereof have turned on very fine points; almost all historians agree he had strong left-wing views during this time and interacted with party members, though there is considerable dispute over whether he was officially a member of the party. At his 1954 security clearance hearings, he denied being a member of the Communist Party but identified himself as a fellow traveler, which he defined as someone who agrees with many of the goals of communism but is not willing to blindly follow orders from any Communist Party apparatus.

Throughout the development of the atomic bomb, Oppenheimer was under investigation by both the FBI and the Manhattan Project's internal security arm for left-wing associations he was known to have had in the past. He was followed by Army security agents during a trip to California in June 1943 to visit his former girlfriend, Jean Tatlock, who was suffering from depression. Oppenheimer spent the night in her apartment. Tatlock committed suicide on January 4, 1944, leaving Oppenheimer deeply grieved. In August 1943, he volunteered to Manhattan Project security agents that George Eltenton, whom he did not know, had solicited three men at Los Alamos for nuclear secrets on behalf of the Soviet Union. When pressed on the issue in later interviews, Oppenheimer admitted that the only person who had approached him was his friend Haakon Chevalier, a Berkeley professor of French literature, who had mentioned the matter privately at a dinner at Oppenheimer's house. Brigadier General Leslie R. Groves, Jr., the director of the Manhattan Project, thought Oppenheimer too important to the project to be ousted over this suspicious behavior. On July 20, 1943, he wrote to the Manhattan Engineer District:

Manhattan Project

Los Alamos 

On October 9, 1941, two months before the United States entered World War II, President Franklin D. Roosevelt approved a crash program to develop an atomic bomb. In May 1942, National Defense Research Committee Chairman James B. Conant, who had been one of Oppenheimer's lecturers at Harvard, invited Oppenheimer to take over work on fast neutron calculations, a task Oppenheimer threw himself into with full vigor. He was given the title "Coordinator of Rapid Rupture", which specifically referred to the propagation of a fast neutron chain reaction in an atomic bomb. One of his first acts was to host a summer school for bomb theory at his building in Berkeley. The mix of European physicists and his own students—a group including Robert Serber, Emil Konopinski, Felix Bloch, Hans Bethe and Edward Teller—kept themselves busy by calculating what needed to be done, and in what order, to make the bomb.

In June 1942, the US Army established the Manhattan Project to handle its part in the atom bomb project and began the process of transferring responsibility from the Office of Scientific Research and Development to the military. In September, Groves was appointed director of what became known as the Manhattan Project. He selected Oppenheimer to head the project's secret weapons laboratory. This choice surprised many, because Oppenheimer had left-wing political views and no record as a leader of large projects. Groves was concerned by the fact that Oppenheimer did not have a Nobel Prize and might not have had the prestige to direct fellow scientists. But he was impressed by Oppenheimer's singular grasp of the practical aspects of designing and constructing an atomic bomb and by the breadth of his knowledge. As a military engineer, Groves knew that this would be vital in an interdisciplinary project that would involve not just physics, but chemistry, metallurgy, ordnance and engineering. Groves also detected in Oppenheimer something that many others did not, an "overweening ambition" that Groves reckoned would supply the drive necessary to push the project to a successful conclusion. Isidor Rabi considered the appointment "a real stroke of genius on the part of General Groves, who was not generally considered to be a genius".

Oppenheimer and Groves decided that for security and cohesion they needed a centralized, secret research laboratory in a remote location. Scouting for a site in late 1942, Oppenheimer was drawn to New Mexico, not far from his ranch. On November 16, 1942, Oppenheimer, Groves and others toured a prospective site. Oppenheimer feared that the high cliffs surrounding the site would make his people feel claustrophobic, while the engineers were concerned with the possibility of flooding. He then suggested and championed a site that he knew well: a flat mesa near Santa Fe, New Mexico, which was the site of a private boys' school, the Los Alamos Ranch School. The engineers were concerned about the poor access road and the water supply but otherwise felt that it was ideal. The Los Alamos Laboratory was built on the site of the school, taking over some of its buildings, while many new buildings were erected in great haste. At the laboratory, Oppenheimer assembled a group of the top physicists of the time, which he called the "luminaries".

Los Alamos was initially supposed to be a military laboratory, and Oppenheimer and other researchers were to be commissioned into the Army. He went so far as to order himself a lieutenant colonel's uniform and take the Army physical test, which he failed. The plan to commission scientists fell through when Rabi and Robert Bacher balked at the idea. Conant, Groves, and Oppenheimer devised a compromise whereby the laboratory was operated by the University of California under contract to the War Department. It soon turned out that Oppenheimer had hugely underestimated the magnitude of the project; Los Alamos grew from a few hundred people in 1943 to over 6,000 in 1945.

Oppenheimer at first had difficulty with the organizational division of large groups, but rapidly learned the art of large-scale administration after he took up permanent residence on the mesa. He was noted for his mastery of all scientific aspects of the project and for his efforts to control the inevitable cultural conflicts between scientists and the military. He was an iconic figure to his fellow scientists, as much a symbol of what they were working toward as a scientific director. Victor Weisskopf put it thus:

 At this point in the war, there was considerable anxiety among the scientists that the Germans might be making faster progress on an atomic weapon than they were. In a letter dated May 25, 1943, Oppenheimer responded to a proposal by Fermi to use radioactive materials to poison German food supplies. Oppenheimer asked Fermi whether he could produce enough strontium without letting too many in on the secret. Oppenheimer continued, "I think we should not attempt a plan unless we can poison food sufficient to kill a half a million men."

In 1943 development efforts were directed to a plutonium gun-type fission weapon called "Thin Man". Initial research on the properties of plutonium was done using cyclotron-generated plutonium-239, which was extremely pure but could be created only in tiny amounts. When Los Alamos received the first sample of plutonium from the X-10 Graphite Reactor in April 1944, a problem was discovered: reactor-bred plutonium had a higher concentration of plutonium-240, making it unsuitable for use in a gun-type weapon. In July 1944, Oppenheimer abandoned the gun design in favor of an implosion-type weapon. Using chemical explosive lenses, a sub-critical sphere of fissile material could be squeezed into a smaller and denser form. The metal needed to travel only very short distances, so the critical mass would be assembled in much less time. In August 1944, Oppenheimer implemented a sweeping reorganization of the Los Alamos laboratory to focus on implosion. He concentrated the development efforts on the gun-type device, a simpler design that only had to work with uranium-235, in a single group; this device became Little Boy in February 1945. After a mammoth research effort, the more complex design of the implosion device, known as the "Christy gadget" after Robert Christy, another student of Oppenheimer's, was finalized in a meeting in Oppenheimer's office on February 28, 1945.

In May 1945 an Interim Committee was created to advise and report on wartime and postwar policies regarding the use of nuclear energy. The Interim Committee in turn established a scientific panel consisting of Arthur Compton, Fermi, Lawrence and Oppenheimer to advise it on scientific issues. In its presentation to the Interim Committee, the scientific panel offered its opinion not just on the likely physical effects of an atomic bomb, but on its likely military and political impact. This included opinions on such sensitive issues as whether the Soviet Union should be advised of the weapon in advance of its use against Japan.

Trinity 

The joint work of the scientists at Los Alamos resulted in the world's first nuclear explosion, near Alamogordo, New Mexico, on July 16, 1945. Oppenheimer had given the site the codename "Trinity" in mid-1944 and said later that it was from one of John Donne's Holy Sonnets. According to the historian Gregg Herken, this naming could have been an allusion to Jean Tatlock, who had committed suicide a few months before and had in the 1930s introduced Oppenheimer to Donne's work.

Oppenheimer later recalled that, while witnessing the explosion, he thought of a verse from the Bhagavad Gita (XI,12): 

Years later he would explain that another verse had also entered his head at that time: namely, the famous verse "" (XI,32), which he translated as "I am become Death, the destroyer of worlds."

In 1965, when he was persuaded to quote again for a television broadcast, he said:

Among those present with Oppenheimer in the control bunker at the site were his brother Frank and Brigadier General Thomas Farrell. When Jeremy Bernstein asked Frank what Robert's first words after the test had been, the answer was "I guess it worked." Farrell summarized Robert's reaction as follows:

Rabi noticed Oppenheimer's disconcerting triumphalism: "I'll never forget his walk; I'll never forget the way he stepped out of the car ... his walk was like High Noon ... this kind of strut. He had done it." At an assembly at Los Alamos on August 6 (the evening of the atomic bombing of Hiroshima), Oppenheimer took to the stage and clasped his hands together "like a prize-winning boxer" while the crowd cheered. He noted his regret the weapon had not been available in time to use against Nazi Germany. But he and many of the project staff were very upset about the bombing of Nagasaki, as they did not feel the second bomb was necessary from a military point of view. He traveled to Washington on August 17 to hand-deliver a letter to Secretary of War Henry L. Stimson expressing his revulsion and his wish to see nuclear weapons banned. In October 1945, Oppenheimer was granted an interview with President Harry S. Truman. The meeting went badly after Oppenheimer said he felt he had "blood on my hands". The remark infuriated Truman and put an end to the meeting. Truman later told his Undersecretary of State Dean Acheson, "I don't want to see that son-of-a-bitch in this office ever again."

For his services as director of Los Alamos, Oppenheimer was awarded the Medal for Merit by President Truman in 1946.

Postwar activities 

The Manhattan Project was top secret and did not become public knowledge until after the bombings of Hiroshima and Nagasaki, and Oppenheimer became a national spokesman for science who was emblematic of a new type of technocratic power. He became a household name and his portrait appeared on the covers of Life and Time. Nuclear physics became a powerful force as all governments of the world began to realize the strategic and political power that came with nuclear weapons. Like many scientists of his generation, he felt that security from atomic bombs would come only from a transnational organization such as the newly formed United Nations, which could institute a program to stifle a nuclear arms race.

Institute for Advanced Study 
In November 1945, Oppenheimer left Los Alamos to return to Caltech, but soon found that his heart was no longer in teaching. In 1947, he accepted an offer from Lewis Strauss to take up the directorship of the Institute for Advanced Study in Princeton, New Jersey. This meant moving back east and leaving Ruth Tolman, the wife of his friend Richard Tolman, with whom he had begun an affair after leaving Los Alamos. He collected European furniture, and French post-impressionist and Fauvist artworks. His art collection included works by Cézanne, Derain, Despiau, de Vlaminck, Picasso, Rembrandt, Renoir, Van Gogh and Vuillard.

Oppenheimer brought together intellectuals at the height of their powers and from a variety of disciplines to answer the most pertinent questions of the age. He directed and encouraged the research of many well-known scientists, including Freeman Dyson, and the duo of Chen Ning Yang and Tsung-Dao Lee, who won a Nobel Prize for their discovery of parity non-conservation. He also instituted temporary memberships for scholars from the humanities, such as T. S. Eliot and George F. Kennan. Some of these activities were resented by a few members of the mathematics faculty, who wanted the institute to stay a bastion of pure scientific research. Abraham Pais said that Oppenheimer himself thought that one of his failures at the institute was being unable to bring together scholars from the natural sciences and the humanities.

During a series of conferences in New York from 1947 through 1949, physicists switched back from war work to theoretical issues. Under Oppenheimer's direction, physicists tackled the greatest outstanding problem of the pre-war years: infinite, divergent, and nonsensical expressions in the quantum electrodynamics of elementary particles. Julian Schwinger, Richard Feynman and Shin'ichiro Tomonaga tackled the problem of regularization, and developed techniques that became known as renormalization. Freeman Dyson was able to prove that their procedures gave similar results. The problem of meson absorption and Hideki Yukawa's theory of mesons as the carrier particles of the strong nuclear force were also tackled. Probing questions from Oppenheimer prompted Robert Marshak's innovative two-meson hypothesis: that there are actually two types of mesons, pions and muons. This led to Cecil Frank Powell's breakthrough and subsequent Nobel Prize for the discovery of the pion.

Atomic Energy Commission 

As a member of the Board of Consultants to a committee appointed by Truman, Oppenheimer strongly influenced the Acheson–Lilienthal Report. In this report, the committee advocated the creation of an international Atomic Development Authority, which would own all fissionable material and the means of its production, such as mines and laboratories, and atomic power plants where it could be used for peaceful energy production. Bernard Baruch was appointed to translate this report into a proposal to the United Nations, resulting in the Baruch Plan of 1946. The Baruch Plan introduced many additional provisions regarding enforcement, in particular requiring inspection of the Soviet Union's uranium resources. It was seen as an attempt to maintain the United States' nuclear monopoly and rejected by the Soviets. With this, it became clear to Oppenheimer that an arms race was unavoidable, due to the mutual suspicion of the United States and the Soviet Union, which even Oppenheimer was starting to distrust.

After the Atomic Energy Commission (AEC) came into being in 1947 as a civilian agency in control of nuclear research and weapons issues, Oppenheimer was appointed as the chairman of its General Advisory Committee (GAC). From this position he advised on a number of nuclear-related issues, including project funding, laboratory construction and even international policy—though the GAC's advice was not always heeded. As chairman of the GAC, Oppenheimer lobbied vigorously for international arms control and funding for basic science, and attempted to influence policy away from a heated arms race.

The first atomic bomb test by the Soviet Union in August 1949 came earlier than Americans expected, and over the next several months there was an intense debate within the U.S. government, military, and scientific communities over whether to proceed with the development of the far more powerful, nuclear fusion-based hydrogen bomb, then known as "the Super". Oppenheimer had been aware of the possibility of a thermonuclear weapon since the days of the Manhattan Project and had allocated a limited amount of theoretical research work toward the possibility at the time, but nothing more than that, given the pressing need to develop a fission weapon. Immediately following the end of the war, Oppenheimer argued against continuing work on the Super at that time, due to both lack of need and the enormous human casualties that would result from its use.

Now in October 1949, Oppenheimer and the GAC recommended against the development of the Super. He and the other GAC members were motivated partly by ethical concerns, feeling that such a weapon could only be strategically used, resulting in millions of deaths: "Its use therefore carries much further than the atomic bomb itself the policy of exterminating civilian populations." They also had practical qualms, as there was no workable design for a hydrogen bomb at the time. Regarding the possibility of the Soviet Union developing a thermonuclear weapon, the GAC felt that the United States could have an adequate stockpile of atomic weapons to retaliate against any thermonuclear attack. In that connection, Oppenheimer and the others were concerned about the opportunity costs that would be incurred if nuclear reactors were diverted from materials needed for atom bomb production to the materials such as tritium needed for a thermonuclear weapon.

A majority of the AEC subsequently endorsed the GAC recommendation, and Oppenheimer thought that the fight against the Super would triumph, but proponents of the weapon lobbied the White House vigorously. On January 31, 1950, Truman, who was predisposed to proceed with the development of the weapon anyway, made the formal decision to do so. Oppenheimer and other GAC opponents of the project, especially James Conant, felt disheartened and considered resigning from the committee. They stayed on, though their views on the hydrogen bomb were well known.

In 1951, Edward Teller and mathematician Stanislaw Ulam developed what became known as the Teller-Ulam design for a hydrogen bomb. This new design seemed technically feasible and Oppenheimer officially acceded to the weapon's development, while still looking for ways in which its testing or deployment or use could be questioned. As he later recalled:

Oppenheimer, Conant, and Lee DuBridge, another member who had opposed the H-bomb decision, left the GAC when their terms expired in August 1952. Truman had declined to reappoint them, as he wanted new voices on the committee who were more in support of H-bomb development. In addition, various opponents of Oppenheimer had communicated to Truman their desire that Oppenheimer leave the committee.

Panels and study groups 
Oppenheimer played a role on a number of government panels and study projects during the late 1940s and early 1950s, some of which found him in the middle of controversies and power struggles.

In 1948 Oppenheimer chaired the Department of Defense's Long-Range Objectives Panel, which looked at the military utility of nuclear weapons including how they might be delivered. After a year's worth of study, in spring 1952 Oppenheimer wrote the draft report of Project GABRIEL, which examined the dangers of nuclear fallout. Oppenheimer was also a member of the Science Advisory Committee of the Office of Defense Mobilization.

Oppenheimer participated in Project Charles during 1951, which examined the possibility of creating an effective air defense of the United States against atomic attack, and in the follow-on Project East River in 1952, which, with Oppenheimer's input, recommended building a warning system that would provide one-hour notice to atomic attacks against American cities. Those two projects led to Project Lincoln in 1952, a large effort where Oppenheimer was one of the senior scientists. Undertaken at the MIT Lincoln Laboratory, which had recently been founded to study issues of air defense, this in turn led to the Lincoln Summer Study Group, where Oppenheimer became a key figure. Oppenheimer's and other scientists' urging that resources be allocated to air defense in preference to large retaliatory strike capabilities brought an immediate response of objection from the United States Air Force (USAF), and debate ensued about whether Oppenheimer and allied scientists, or the Air Force, was embracing an inflexible "Maginot Line" philosophy. In any case, the Summer Study Group's work eventually led to the building of the Distant Early Warning Line.

Teller, who had been so uninterested in work on the atomic bomb at Los Alamos during the war that Oppenheimer had given him time instead to work on his own project of the hydrogen bomb, left Los Alamos in 1951 to help found, in 1952, a second laboratory at what would become the Lawrence Livermore National Laboratory. Oppenheimer had defended the history of work done at Los Alamos and opposed the creation of the second laboratory.

Project Vista looked at improving U.S. tactical warfare capabilities. Oppenheimer was a late addition to the project in 1951, but wrote a key chapter of the report that challenged the doctrine of strategic bombardment and advocated for smaller tactical nuclear weapons which would be more useful in a limited theater conflict against enemy forces. Strategic thermonuclear weapons delivered by long-range jet bombers would necessarily be under the control of the U.S. Air Force, whereas the Vista conclusions recommended an increased role for the U.S. Army and U.S. Navy as well. The Air Force reaction to this was immediately hostile, and it succeeded in getting the Vista report suppressed.

During 1952 Oppenheimer chaired the five-member State Department Panel of Consultants on Disarmament, which first urged that the United States postpone its planned first test of the hydrogen bomb and seek a thermonuclear test ban with the Soviet Union, on the grounds that avoiding a test might forestall the development of a catastrophic new weapon and open the way for new arms agreements between the two nations. But the panel lacked political allies in Washington, and the Ivy Mike shot went ahead as scheduled. The panel then issued a final report in January 1953, which, influenced by many of Oppenheimer's deeply felt beliefs, presented a pessimistic vision of the future in which neither the United States nor the Soviet Union could establish effective nuclear superiority but both sides could effect terrible damage on the other. One of the panel's recommendations, which Oppenheimer felt was especially important, was that the U.S. government practice less secrecy and more openness toward the American people about the realities of the nuclear balance and the dangers of nuclear warfare. This notion found a receptive audience in the new Eisenhower administration and led to creation of Operation Candor. Oppenheimer subsequently presented his view on the lack of utility of ever-larger nuclear arsenals to the American public in a June 1953 article in Foreign Affairs, and it received attention in major American newspapers.

Thus by 1953, Oppenheimer had reached another peak of influence, being involved in multiple different government posts and projects and having access to crucial strategic plans and force levels. But at the same time, he had become the enemy of the proponents of strategic bombardment, who viewed his opposition to the H-bomb, followed by these accumulated positions and stances, with a combination of bitterness and distrust. This view was paired with their fear that Oppenheimer's fame and powers of persuasion had made him dangerously influential in government, military, and scientific circles.

Security hearing 

The FBI under J. Edgar Hoover had been following Oppenheimer since before the war, when he showed communist sympathies as a professor at Berkeley and had been close to members of the Communist Party, including his wife and brother. They strongly suspected that he himself was a member of the party, based on wiretaps in which party members referred to him or appeared to refer to him as a communist, as well as reports from informers within the party. He had been under close surveillance since the early 1940s, his home and office bugged, his phone tapped and his mail opened. The FBI furnished Oppenheimer's political enemies with evidence that implicated communist ties. These enemies included Strauss, an AEC commissioner who had long harbored resentment against Oppenheimer both for his activity in opposing the hydrogen bomb and for his humiliation of Strauss before Congress some years earlier; regarding Strauss's opposition to the export of radioactive isotopes to other nations, Oppenheimer had memorably categorized these as "less important than electronic devices but more important than, let us say, vitamins".

On June 7, 1949, Oppenheimer testified before the House Un-American Activities Committee that he had associations with the Communist Party USA in the 1930s. He testified that some of his students, including David Bohm, Giovanni Rossi Lomanitz, Philip Morrison, Bernard Peters, and Joseph Weinberg had been communists at the time they had worked with him at Berkeley. Frank Oppenheimer and his wife Jackie testified before HUAC that they had been members of the Communist Party USA. Frank was subsequently fired from his University of Minnesota position. Unable to find work in physics for many years, he became a cattle rancher in Colorado. He later taught high school physics and was the founder of the San Francisco Exploratorium.

The triggering event for the security hearing happened on November 7, 1953, when William Liscum Borden, who until earlier in the year had been the executive director of the United States Congress Joint Committee on Atomic Energy, sent Hoover a letter saying that "more probably than not J. Robert Oppenheimer is an agent of the Soviet Union." Eisenhower never exactly believed the allegations in the letter, but felt compelled to move forward with an investigation, and on December 3 he ordered that a "blank wall" be placed between Oppenheimer and any government or military secrets. On December 21, 1953, Strauss told Oppenheimer that his security clearance had been suspended, pending resolution of a series of charges outlined in a letter, and discussed his resigning by way of requesting termination of his consulting contract with the AEC. Oppenheimer chose not to resign and requested a hearing instead. The charges were outlined in a letter from Kenneth D. Nichols, General Manager of the AEC. The hearing that followed in April–May 1954, which was held in secret, focused on Oppenheimer's past communist ties and his association during the Manhattan Project with suspected disloyal or communist scientists. It then continued with an examination of Oppenheimer's opposition to the H-bomb and stances in subsequent projects and study groups. A transcript of the hearings was published in June 1954, with some redactions. The US Department of Energy made public the full text of the transcript in October 2014.

One of the key elements in this hearing was Oppenheimer's earliest testimony about George Eltenton's approach to various Los Alamos scientists, a story that Oppenheimer confessed he had fabricated to protect his friend Haakon Chevalier. Unknown to Oppenheimer, both versions were recorded during his interrogations of a decade before. He was surprised on the witness stand with transcripts of these, which he had not been given a chance to review. In fact, Oppenheimer had never told Chevalier that he had finally named him, and the testimony had cost Chevalier his job. Both Chevalier and Eltenton confirmed mentioning that they had a way to get information to the Soviets, Eltenton admitting he said this to Chevalier and Chevalier admitting he mentioned it to Oppenheimer, but both put the matter in terms of gossip and denied any thought or suggestion of treason or thoughts of espionage, either in planning or in deed. Neither was ever convicted of any crime.

Teller testified that he considered Oppenheimer loyal to the US government, but that:

This led to outrage by the scientific community and Teller's virtual expulsion from academic science. Ernest Lawrence refused to testify on the grounds that he was suffering from an attack of ulcerative colitis, but an interview transcript in which he condemned Oppenheimer was presented as evidence in his absence. Groves, threatened by the FBI as having been potentially part of a coverup about the Chevalier contact in 1943, likewise testified against Oppenheimer. Many top scientists, as well as government and military figures, testified on Oppenheimer's behalf. Inconsistencies in his testimony and his erratic behavior on the stand, at one point saying he had given a "cock and bull story" and that this was because he "was an idiot", convinced some that he was unstable, unreliable and a possible security risk. Oppenheimer's clearance was revoked one day before it was due to lapse anyway. Rabi commented that Oppenheimer was merely a government consultant at the time anyway and that if the government "didn't want to consult the guy, then don't consult him".

During his hearing, Oppenheimer testified willingly on the left-wing activities of many of his scientific colleagues. Had Oppenheimer's clearance not been stripped, he might have been remembered as someone who had "named names" to save his own reputation. As it happened, Oppenheimer was seen by most of the scientific community as a martyr to McCarthyism, an eclectic liberal who was unjustly attacked by warmongering enemies, symbolic of the shift of scientific creativity from academia into the military. Wernher von Braun summed up his opinion about the matter with a quip to a Congressional committee: "In England, Oppenheimer would have been knighted."

In a seminar at The Wilson Center in 2009, based on an extensive analysis of the Vassiliev notebooks taken from the KGB archives, John Earl Haynes, Harvey Klehr and Alexander Vassiliev confirmed that Oppenheimer never was involved in espionage for the Soviet Union. Soviet intelligence tried repeatedly to recruit him, but was never successful; Oppenheimer did not spy on the United States. In addition, he had several persons removed from the Manhattan Project who had sympathies to the Soviet Union. Haynes, Klehr and Vassiliev also state Oppenheimer "was, in fact, a concealed member of the CPUSA in the late 1930s". According to biographer Ray Monk: "He was, in a very practical and real sense, a supporter of the Communist Party. Moreover, in terms of the time, effort and money spent on party activities, he was a very committed supporter".

On December 16, 2022, United States Secretary of Energy Jennifer Granholm vacated the 1954 revocation of Oppenheimer's security clearance. Her statement said, "In 1954, the Atomic Energy Commission revoked Dr. Oppenheimer’s security clearance through a flawed process that violated the Commission’s own regulations. As time has passed, more evidence has come to light of the bias and unfairness of the process that Dr. Oppenheimer was subjected to while the evidence of his loyalty and love of country have only been further affirmed."

Final years and death 

Starting in 1954, Oppenheimer lived for several months of the year on the island of Saint John in the U.S. Virgin Islands. In 1957, he purchased a  tract of land on Gibney Beach, where he built a spartan home on the beach. He spent a considerable amount of time sailing with his daughter Toni and wife Kitty.

Oppenheimer's first public appearance following the stripping of his security clearance was a lecture titled "Prospects in the Arts and Sciences" for the Columbia University Bicentennial radio show Man's Right to Knowledge, in which he outlined his philosophy and his thoughts on the role of science in the modern world. He had been selected for the final episode of the lecture series two years prior to the security hearing, though the university remained adamant that he stay on even after the controversy.

In February 1955, the president of the University of Washington, Henry Schmitz, abruptly canceled an invitation to Oppenheimer to deliver a series of lectures there. Schmitz's decision caused an uproar among the students; 1,200 of them signed a petition protesting the decision, and Schmitz was burned in effigy. While they marched in protest, the state of Washington outlawed the Communist Party, and required all government employees to swear a loyalty oath. Edwin Albrecht Uehling, the chairman of the physics department and a colleague of Oppenheimer's from Berkeley, appealed to the university senate, and Schmitz's decision was overturned by a vote of 56 to 40. Oppenheimer stopped briefly in Seattle to change planes on a trip to Oregon, and was joined for coffee during his layover by several University of Washington faculty, but Oppenheimer never lectured there.

Oppenheimer was increasingly concerned about the potential danger that scientific inventions could pose to humanity. He joined with Albert Einstein, Bertrand Russell, Joseph Rotblat and other eminent scientists and academics to establish what would eventually, in 1960, become the World Academy of Art and Science. Significantly, after his public humiliation, he did not sign the major open protests against nuclear weapons of the 1950s, including the Russell–Einstein Manifesto of 1955, nor, though invited, did he attend the first Pugwash Conferences on Science and World Affairs in 1957.

In his speeches and public writings, Oppenheimer continually stressed the difficulty of managing the power of knowledge in a world in which the freedom of science to exchange ideas was more and more hobbled by political concerns. Oppenheimer delivered the Reith Lectures on the BBC in 1953, which were subsequently published as Science and the Common Understanding. In 1955, Oppenheimer published The Open Mind, a collection of eight lectures that he had given since 1946 on the subject of nuclear weapons and popular culture. Oppenheimer rejected the idea of nuclear gunboat diplomacy. "The purposes of this country in the field of foreign policy", he wrote, "cannot in any real or enduring way be achieved by coercion". In 1957 the philosophy and psychology departments at Harvard invited Oppenheimer to deliver the William James Lectures. An influential group of Harvard alumni led by Edwin Ginn that included Archibald Roosevelt protested against the decision. Some 1,200 people packed Sanders Theatre to hear Oppenheimer's six lectures, titled "The Hope of Order". Oppenheimer delivered the Whidden Lectures at McMaster University in 1962, and these were published in 1964 as The Flying Trapeze: Three Crises for Physicists.

Deprived of political power, Oppenheimer continued to lecture, write and work on physics. He toured Europe and Japan, giving talks about the history of science, the role of science in society, and the nature of the universe. In September 1957, France made him an Officer of the Legion of Honor, and on May 3, 1962, he was elected a Foreign Member of the Royal Society in Britain. At the urging of many of Oppenheimer's political friends who had ascended to power, President John F. Kennedy awarded Oppenheimer the Enrico Fermi Award in 1963 as a gesture of political rehabilitation. Teller, the winner of the previous year's award, had also recommended Oppenheimer receive it, in the hope that it would heal the rift between them. A little over a week after Kennedy's assassination, his successor, President Lyndon Johnson, presented Oppenheimer with the award, "for contributions to theoretical physics as a teacher and originator of ideas, and for leadership of the Los Alamos Laboratory and the atomic energy program during critical years". Oppenheimer told Johnson: "I think it is just possible, Mr. President, that it has taken some charity and some courage for you to make this award today."

The rehabilitation implied by the award was partly symbolic, as Oppenheimer still lacked a security clearance and could have no effect on official policy, but the award came with a $50,000 tax-free stipend, and its award outraged many prominent Republicans in Congress. The late President Kennedy's widow Jacqueline, still living in the White House, made it a point to meet with Oppenheimer to tell him how much her husband had wanted him to have the medal. While still a senator in 1959, Kennedy had been instrumental in voting to narrowly deny Oppenheimer's enemy Lewis Strauss a coveted government position as Secretary of Commerce, effectively ending Strauss's political career. This was partly due to lobbying by the scientific community on behalf of Oppenheimer.

Oppenheimer was a chain smoker who was diagnosed with throat cancer in late 1965. After inconclusive surgery, he underwent unsuccessful radiation treatment and chemotherapy late in 1966. He fell into a coma on February 15, 1967, and died at his home in Princeton, New Jersey, on February 18, aged 62. A memorial service was held a week later at Alexander Hall on the campus of Princeton University. The service was attended by 600 of his scientific, political and military associates that included Bethe, Groves, Kennan, Lilienthal, Rabi, Smyth and Wigner. His brother Frank and the rest of his family were also there, as was the historian Arthur M. Schlesinger, Jr., the novelist John O'Hara, and George Balanchine, the director of the New York City Ballet. Bethe, Kennan and Smyth gave brief eulogies.  Oppenheimer's body was cremated and his ashes placed in an urn. His wife took the ashes to St. John and dropped the urn into the sea, within sight of the beach house.

In October 1972, Kitty died aged 62 from an intestinal infection complicated by a pulmonary embolism. Oppenheimer's ranch in New Mexico was then inherited by their son Peter, and the beach property was inherited by their daughter Katherine "Toni" Oppenheimer Silber. Toni was refused security clearance for her chosen vocation as a United Nations translator after the FBI brought up the old charges against her father. In January 1977 (three months after the end of her second marriage), she committed suicide aged 32; her ex-husband found her hanging from a beam in her family beach house. She left the property to "the people of St. John for a public park and recreation area". The original house was built too close to the coast and succumbed to a hurricane. Today the Virgin Islands Government maintains a Community Center in the area.

Legacy 
When Oppenheimer was stripped of his position of political influence in 1954, he symbolized for many the folly of scientists who believed they could control the use of their research, and the dilemmas of moral responsibility presented by science in the nuclear age. The hearings were motivated by politics and personal enmities, and also reflected a stark divide in the nuclear weapons community. One group viewed with passionate fear the Soviet Union as a mortal enemy and believed having the most powerful weaponry capable of providing the most massive retaliation was the best strategy for combating that threat. The other group felt that developing the H-bomb would not in fact improve the Western security position and that using the weapon against large civilian populations would be an act of genocide, and advocated instead a more flexible response to the Soviets involving tactical nuclear weapons, strengthened conventional forces, and arms control agreements. The first of these groups was the more powerful in political terms, and Oppenheimer became its target.

Rather than consistently oppose the "Red-baiting" of the late 1940s and early 1950s, Oppenheimer testified against some of his former colleagues and students, both before and during his hearing. In one incident, his damning testimony against former student Bernard Peters was selectively leaked to the press. Historians have interpreted this as an attempt by Oppenheimer to please his colleagues in the government and perhaps to divert attention from his own previous left-wing ties and those of his brother. In the end, it became a liability when it became clear that if Oppenheimer had really doubted Peters' loyalty, his recommending him for the Manhattan Project was reckless, or at least contradictory.

Popular depictions of Oppenheimer view his security struggles as a confrontation between right-wing militarists (symbolized by Teller) and left-wing intellectuals (symbolized by Oppenheimer) over the moral question of weapons of mass destruction. The Oppenheimer story has often been viewed by biographers and historians as a modern tragedy. National security advisor and academic McGeorge Bundy, who had worked with Oppenheimer on the State Department Panel of Consultants, has written: "Quite aside from Oppenheimer's extraordinary rise and fall in prestige and power, his character has fully tragic dimensions in its combination of charm and arrogance, intelligence and blindness, awareness and insensitivity, and perhaps above all daring and fatalism. All these, in different ways, were turned against him in the hearings."

The question of the scientists' responsibility toward humanity inspired Bertolt Brecht's drama Galileo (1955), left its imprint on Friedrich Dürrenmatt's Die Physiker, and is the basis of the opera Doctor Atomic by John Adams (2005), which was commissioned to portray Oppenheimer as a modern-day Faust. Heinar Kipphardt's play In the Matter of J. Robert Oppenheimer, after appearing on West German television, had its theatrical release in Berlin and Munich in October 1964. Oppenheimer's objections resulted in an exchange of correspondence with Kipphardt, in which the playwright offered to make corrections but defended the play. It  premiered in New York in June 1968, with Joseph Wiseman in the Oppenheimer role. New York Times theater critic Clive Barnes called it an "angry play and a partisan play" that sided with Oppenheimer but portrayed the scientist as a "tragic fool and genius". Oppenheimer had difficulty with this portrayal. After reading a transcript of Kipphardt's play soon after it began to be performed, Oppenheimer threatened to sue the playwright, decrying "improvisations which were contrary to history and to the nature of the people involved".

Later Oppenheimer told an interviewer:

Oppenheimer is the subject of numerous biographies, including American Prometheus: The Triumph and Tragedy of J. Robert Oppenheimer (2005) by Kai Bird and Martin J. Sherwin which won the Pulitzer Prize for Biography or Autobiography for 2006. The 1980 BBC TV serial Oppenheimer, starring Sam Waterston, won three BAFTA Television Awards. The Day After Trinity, a 1980 documentary about J. Robert Oppenheimer and the building of the atomic bomb, was nominated for an Academy Award and received a Peabody Award. Oppenheimer's life has also been explored in the 2015 play Oppenheimer by Tom Morton-Smith, and in the 1989 film Fat Man and Little Boy, where he was portrayed by Dwight Schultz. In the upcoming American film Oppenheimer, directed by Christopher Nolan and based on American Prometheus, Oppenheimer is portrayed by actor Cillian Murphy. A centennial conference and exhibit were held in 2004 at Berkeley, with the proceedings of the conference published in 2005 as Reappraising Oppenheimer: Centennial Studies and Reflections. His papers are in the Library of Congress.

As a scientist, Oppenheimer is remembered by his students and colleagues as being a brilliant researcher and engaging teacher who was the founder of modern theoretical physics in the United States. Because his scientific attentions often changed rapidly, he never worked long enough on any one topic and carried it to fruition to merit the Nobel Prize, although his investigations contributing to the theory of black holes may have warranted the prize had he lived long enough to see them brought into fruition by later astrophysicists. An asteroid, 67085 Oppenheimer, was named in his honor, as was the lunar crater Oppenheimer.

As a military and public policy advisor, Oppenheimer was a technocratic leader in a shift in the interactions between science and the military and the emergence of "Big Science". During World War II, scientists became involved in military research to an unprecedented degree. Because of the threat fascism posed to Western civilization, they volunteered in great numbers both for technological and organizational assistance to the Allied effort, resulting in such powerful tools as radar, the proximity fuse and operations research. As a cultured, intellectual, theoretical physicist who became a disciplined military organizer, Oppenheimer represented the shift away from the idea that scientists had their "head in the clouds" and that knowledge on such previously esoteric subjects as the composition of the atomic nucleus had no "real-world" applications.

Two days before the Trinity test, Oppenheimer expressed his hopes and fears in a quotation from Bhartṛhari's Śatakatraya:

Bibliography 

}
}
} (posthumous)
 (posthumous)
 (posthumous)
 (posthumous)

Notes

References

Citations

Sources

External links 

Biography and online exhibit created for the centennial of his birth
1965 Audio Interview with J. Robert Oppenheimer by Stephane Groueff Voices of the Manhattan Project 
Was Oppenheimer a member of the Communist Party? documents on the question
On Atomic Energy, Problems to Civilization audio file of UC Berkeley talk, November 1946
Oppenheimer talking about the experience of the first bomb test (video file, "Now I am become death, destroyer of worlds.")
"Freedom and Necessity in the Sciences" audio and documents from a lecture at Dartmouth College, April 1959

 
American nuclear physicists
Quantum physicists
Nuclear weapons scientists and engineers
1904 births
1967 deaths
Academics of the University of Cambridge
Alumni of Christ's College, Cambridge
American agnostics
American anti-fascists
American people of World War II
American people of German-Jewish descent
California Institute of Technology faculty
Deaths from cancer in New Jersey
Directors of the Institute for Advanced Study
Enrico Fermi Award recipients
Ethical Culture Fieldston School alumni
Foreign Members of the Royal Society
Harvard College alumni
Institute for Advanced Study faculty
Jewish agnostics
Jewish anti-fascists
Jewish American scientists
Jewish physicists
Manhattan Project people
Victims of McCarthyism
Medal for Merit recipients
Members of the American Philosophical Society
Officiers of the Légion d'honneur
Scientists from New York City
American relativity theorists
University of California, Berkeley faculty
University of Göttingen alumni
20th-century American physicists
The Century Foundation
Burials at sea
Presidents of the American Physical Society